José 'Pepe' Murcia González (born 3 December 1964) is a Spanish football manager who manages Qatari Second Division side Muaither SC.

Career
Born in Córdoba, Andalusia, Murcia never played in higher than Segunda División B, and retired in 1992 at the age of only 27 due to injury. He coached several local youth teams in his early years, including Córdoba CF. After a successful spell with the reserves (two consecutive promotions all the way to Tercera División), he was one of four managers for the main squad in the 2001–02 season, achieving four wins, two draws and two losses during his eight games in charge as they eventually retained their Segunda División status.

Murcia then plied his trade in the third division, leading Atlético Madrid's B team to the league championship in his first year, albeit with no playoff promotion. On 9 January 2006, following a 0–0 La Liga home draw against Valencia CF, he was appointed the Colchoneros first team's manager, replacing the dismissed Carlos Bianchi; they ranked 12th at that time, going on to finish the campaign in tenth position.

Murcia spent the following four years in the second tier with as many clubs, not managing to finish one single season but with none of the teams eventually losing their league status. On 30 November 2009, after a 2–3 home defeat to CD Numancia, he was fired at Albacete Balompié due to negative results, with the Castile-La Mancha side in 16th position at that time– eventually ending 15th.

On 9 August 2011, Murcia signed a two-year contract with Romania's FC Brașov, but resigned at the Liga I club after three matches due to family reasons. In June 2014, after nearly three years out of football, he was appointed at PFC Levski Sofia in Bulgaria. 

Murcia was sacked on 4 August 2014, due to poor results. In November 2016, whilst working out on his own, the FC Legirus Inter manager suffered a heart attack, slipping into a coma but eventually recovering.

In June 2017, Murcia was hired by Al-Shahania SC, newly relegated to the Qatari Second Division. He won promotion to the Qatar Stars League with an unbeaten first season, and then came seventh in his second, earning him a nomination for Manager of the Year alongside Jesualdo Ferreira of champions Al Sadd SC.

Managerial statistics

Honours
ManagerAtlético Madrid BSegunda División B: 2003–04Al-Shahania'
Qatari Second Division: 2017–18

References

External links

Levski official profile

1964 births
Living people
Footballers from Córdoba, Spain
Spanish footballers
Association football forwards
Segunda División B players
Tercera División players
Real Jaén footballers
Córdoba CF players
Spanish football managers
La Liga managers
Segunda División managers
Segunda División B managers
Tercera División managers
Córdoba CF managers
FC Cartagena managers
Atlético Madrid B managers
Atlético Madrid managers
Xerez CD managers
CD Castellón managers
RC Celta de Vigo managers
Albacete Balompié managers
UD Salamanca managers
Liga I managers
FC Brașov (1936) managers
PFC Levski Sofia managers
Qatar Stars League managers
Al-Shahania Sports Club managers
Tunisian Ligue Professionnelle 1 managers
CS Sfaxien managers
Spanish expatriate football managers
Expatriate football managers in Romania
Expatriate football managers in Bulgaria
Expatriate football managers in Finland
Expatriate football managers in Qatar
Expatriate football managers in Tunisia
Spanish expatriate sportspeople in Romania
Spanish expatriate sportspeople in Bulgaria
Spanish expatriate sportspeople in Finland
Spanish expatriate sportspeople in Qatar
Spanish expatriate sportspeople in Tunisia
Córdoba CF B managers